Pompeia Paulina (fl. 1st century) was the wife of the statesman, philosopher, and orator Lucius Annaeus Seneca, and she was part of a circle of educated Romans who sought to lead a principled life under the emperor Nero. She was likely the daughter of Pompeius Paulinus, an eques from Arelate in Gaul. Seneca was the emperor's tutor and later became his political adviser and minister. In 65 AD Nero demanded that Seneca commit suicide, having accused Seneca of taking part in the Pisonian conspiracy against him. Paulina attempted to die with her husband, but survived the suicide attempt.

Sources
Most of what is known about Paulina comes from Tacitus' account of Seneca's suicide described in his Annals. Seneca also mentions her by name in his Letters.

In an early work (Ad Helvium 2.5) Seneca mentions his infant son who had recently died, and in a later work (De Ira 3.36.3-4) he mentions how his wife understands his nightly meditations. In neither case is it certain whether Paulina was his first wife or whether he had an earlier marriage.

Family
Pliny the Elder mentions in his Natural History (33.143) that the family Pompeii Paulini came from Arelate in Gaul. Sometime between 48 and 55 AD, Seneca wrote his dialogue De Brevitate Vitae addressed to a Paulinus. This Paulinus was praefectus annonae, the official who superintended the grain supply of Rome. He was likely an eques called Pompeius Paulinus, and it is generally thought that he was the father of Paulina. 
Another member of the family, Aulus Pompeius Paulinus, served as legate in Lower Germany around 55 AD and is thought to have been her brother.

Seneca's account
The one significant mention of Paulina in Seneca's works is in Letter 104 dating to 64 AD. Seneca wrote the epistle just after he had travelled to his Nomentum villa from Rome where he had been feeling unwell:

Suicide attempt 
In the aftermath of the Pisonian conspiracy, Nero ordered Seneca as his former advisor and tutor to kill himself and sent soldiers to see that the deed was done. Tacitus reports that Pompeia also wanted to die, and she did plan to kill herself. Seneca cut veins in his arms and legs, and Pompeia also slit her wrists, much to Seneca's dismay, though he did not entirely disapprove. Upon learning that she was trying to kill herself, Nero ordered that Pompeia not die, more to save face than to save her life. He sent several soldiers to ensure that her slaves and freedmen bandaged her. Servants then made a tourniquet, her arms were wrapped, and she survived.

After much reconsideration, she decided to follow her dead husband's advice and continue with life, and served as caretaker to her husband's memory.  However, after the suicide attempt, she was said to have been very frail, with an unusually pale face. She never remarried, and died a few years later.

In art

Painting 
Paulina has often been depicted alongside her husband in paintings of his suicide especially in French art. This includes Noël Hallé's La Mort de Sénèque of 1750. In 1773 the Académie Royale used Seneca's death as the theme for its Grand Prix. First prize went to Pierre Peyron, but his painting has been lost although drawings survive. Jacques-Louis David's La Mort de Sénèque was also exhibited. Both paintings featured Paulina prominently, especially David's. Jean-Joseph Taillasson's 1791 painting Pauline, femme de Sénèque, rappelée à la vie is unique in focusing on Paulina to the exclusion of Seneca. It depicts a Roman soldier entering the room, and ordering her bleeding to be stopped.

Literature 
Pompeia Paulina is one of the 106 famous women described by Giovanni Boccaccio in his De mulieribus claris as biography 94. Similarly she was one of three Roman women eulogised by Michel de Montaigne in his Essais 2.35 "De trois bonne femmes":

Notes

References
 Tacitus, Annales xv.60–61, 63–64

External links

1st-century Romans
1st-century Roman women
Pompeii (Romans)